Uegitglanis zammaranoi is the only species of catfish (order Siluriformes) in the genus Uegitglanis of the family Clariidae. It is endemic to Somalia, where it only occurs in caves near the Jubba and the Shebelle Rivers. This species grows to about 10.1 cm (4.0 in) in total length.

U. zammaranoi is hypothesized to be the sister group to Heteropneustes and the remaining clariids. The problematic relationship of this species to the rest of the family is due to the lack of a labyrinth organ that characterizes the family.

Two other cavefish species are in Somalia: the cyprinids Barbopsis devecchi and Phreatichthys andruzzii.

References

Uegitglanis
Cave fish
Fish of Somalia
Endemic fauna of Somalia
Fish described in 1923
Taxonomy articles created by Polbot